Teoh Seng Khoon (8 November 1918 – 31 July 2018) was a Malaysian badminton player who represented his country in team and individual competition between 1940s to 1950s.

Early life
Teoh was born on 8 November 1918 in Ipoh, Perak, Malaya. He studied at Anglo-Chinese School (ACS) Ipoh and spent his early years as a journalist and later as Ipoh bureau chief for the ‘Straits Echo and Times of Malaya’.

Badminton career
Teoh played on the 1949 Malayan Thomas Cup (men's international) team and won the world title. Paired with Ooi Teik Hock, he was undefeated in the Thomas Cup doubles matches. He also shared the men's doubles title at the All-England Championships in 1949 with Ooi.

Personal life
Teoh married Foo Soon Tai and together they had a son and three daughters.

Death
Teoh, the last surviving member of the first-ever Malaya Thomas Cup team, died peacefully in Ipoh on 31 July 2018, aged 99.

Achievements

International tournaments 
Men's doubles

References

External links
张成群 at 中羽在线

1918 births
2018 deaths
Malaysian male badminton players
People from Ipoh
Malaysian sportspeople of Chinese descent